Rangsan Iam-Wiroj, born July 13, 1982) is a Thai former professional footballer.

Rangsan is a tough tackling full back, who can also operate in midfield.

Club career

He established himself as the first choice right back at Thai Port.

Rangsan missed out on playing in the 2009 Thai FA Cup Final against his former club BEC Tero due to Injury.

He was named 2009 Thai Port player of the season.

He played in the 2010 Thai League Cup final and won a winner's medal after Thai Port defeated Buriram PEA F.C. 2-1.

Rangsan transferred to Police United F.C. in December 2010.

Honours

Thai FA Cup Winner

2009 - Thai Port FC

References

External links
 https://web.archive.org/web/20100131074925/http://www.thaiportfc.com/first-team/players.html

Rangsan Iam-Wiroj
Living people
1982 births
Rangsan Iam-Wiroj
Rangsan Iam-Wiroj
Rangsan Iam-Wiroj
Rangsan Iam-Wiroj
Rangsan Iam-Wiroj
Rangsan Iam-Wiroj
Association football fullbacks